Keve, the son of Csele of the Zemény clan, was a legendary Hun leader in the 4th century. Keve was captain of a group of soldiers who headed west into Pannonia in the late 4th century. They fought against the armies of Prince Macrinus from Lombardy. As Huns settled on his land above the Tisza, he felt that his country was being destroyed. Living within the Roman Empire, he asked the Romans for help fighting against the Huns. 

Detre of Verona and his army of Italians, Germans, and other peoples joined forces with Macrinus at Sicambria, where they were attacked by the Huns in the middle of the night. Detre and Macrinus fought several days in retaliation on the field of Tárnok Valley, across the Tisza, and near the town of Tulln (now in Austria, not far from Vienna). There were heavy losses on both sides, including Captain Keve, who died during the Battle of the Tárnok Valley.

In the end, Macrinus was killed and Detra was wounded by an arrow to his head. The Roman army fled. Keve is believed to be buried by the side of the highway "according to the Scythian custom" with other Hunnic leaders, including Kadocsa and Bela. The region where he was buried was called Keveháza and a decorative stone idol was placed near his burial site. After his death, the Hun king Attila was also buried next to these men. 

According to the legend, Keve's daughter Ríka (Réka in today's form) was married to the Hun king Attila.

See also
 Kádár (Hun judge)
 Pannonia § Prior to Roman conquest
 History of Hungary before the Hungarian Conquest § Migration period]

References

Legendary characters
4th century
Hungarian mythology
Huns
Hungarian people